The Progressive Conservative Party of Ontario is one of the three largest political parties in Ontario, along with the Ontario NDP and the Liberal Party of Ontario running in the next Ontario provincial election. It has served as the Official Opposition since 2003, having previously formed two successive majority governments in 1995 and 1999.

The party has currently named 98 candidates. Six ridings have not had a candidate named yet, while two have resigned  and one was fired. The current leader of the party is Tim Hudak.

References

2014|*